Marcus Frank Harelik (born June 5, 1951) is an American television, film, and stage actor, and playwright.

Early life
Harelik was born in Hamilton, Texas. 

In 1909, Harelik's Russian Jewish grandfather, Haskell Harelik—upon whom Harelik's 1985 play, The Immigrant, is based—immigrated to Galveston, Texas.

Career
In 1987, he moved to Los Angeles where he co-wrote, with Randal Myler, Hank Williams: Lost Highway. In 1990, he worked in the Howard Korder play Search and Destroy and the William Ball play Cherry Orchard.

Harelik has appeared in the films Election, Jurassic Park III, Eulogy, and For Your Consideration. For animation; he was the voice of Queen Uberta’s valet, Lord Rogers, in The Swan Princess. Harelik has played parts on the television series Seinfeld, Numbers, Wings, Grace Under Fire, Will & Grace, NCIS, Boy Meets World, Breaking Bad, Bones, Six Feet Under and five episodes of the first season of The Big Bang Theory as Dr. Eric Gablehauser. He also played Sara Tancredi's lawyer in Prison Break. He appeared on the series finale of Cheers, in a 2002 episode of Joss Whedon's Angel as Count Kurushu, and "Counterpoint" an episode of Star Trek: Voyager. He also appeared in five episodes of short-lived NBC series Awake.

In 2015, he appeared under his own name as an actor hired by the Heavenly host to play God then later as God himself in the TV series Preacher.

Harelik appeared in the Broadway musical The Light in the Piazza. Harelik's play, The Immigrant, has been well-received, and was adapted into a musical of the same name.

In 1997, he released a sequel, The Legacy, changing it from a true story to fiction. He has appeared in several other plays including Temptation (1989), The Heidi Chronicles (1991), Elmer Gantry (1991), Tartuffe (1999), Old Money (2000), The Hollow Lands (2000), Be Aggressive, The Beard of Avon (2001), Cyrano de Bergerac (2004). Harelik also played Dr. Paul Stickley in HBO's series Getting On, an American adaptation of the British sitcom of the same name.

In 2015, Harelik co-starred as Jamie Thompson's father in This Isn't Funny, and in 2017, he played baseball player Hank Greenberg in the film Battle of the Sexes.

Personal life
He is married to actress Spencer Kayden, who has acted in theatre productions alongside him. They have one child.

Filmography

Film

Television

Awards and nominations
2005 Drama Desk Award for Outstanding Book of a Musical — The Immigrant (nominee)
2003 Lucille Lortel Award for Outstanding Musical — Hank Williams: Lost Highway (nominee)
2011 Lunt-Fontanne Fellow at Ten Chimneys Foundation

Publications
The Immigrant
The Legacy

References

External links

Mark Harelik at the Lortel Archives
Mark Harelik at the BroadwayWorld.com Database

1951 births
Male actors from Texas
American male film actors
American male stage actors
American people of Russian-Jewish descent
American male television actors
People from Hamilton, Texas
Living people
20th-century American dramatists and playwrights
American male dramatists and playwrights
Writers from Texas
20th-century American male actors
21st-century American male actors
20th-century American male writers